Aromobates mayorgai (common name: Mayorga rocket frog) is a species of frog in the family Aromobatidae. It is endemic to the Mérida state of western Venezuela.
Its natural habitat is cloud forest where it occurs along mountain streams. The male protects the eggs that are laid on land. After hatching, the male carries the tadpoles on his back to water where they develop further.

This species is threatened by habitat loss. Also the invasive bullfrog Lithobates catesbeianus is a threat.

References

mayorgai
Amphibians of Venezuela
Endemic fauna of Venezuela
Taxonomy articles created by Polbot
Amphibians described in 1980